The Hits Album, or Hits 1 as it is often called, is a compilation album released by CBS (Now Sony BMG) and WEA in November 1984. The album was released as a rival to the already successful Now That's What I Call Music series which EMI and Virgin Records had launched in November 1983. The Hits Album reached No. 1 in the UK Top 100 Albums chart for seven weeks and remained in the chart for 36 weeks. This album kept Now 4 from the coveted No. 1 spot over Christmas 1984 – the only Now album in the original series not to reach No. 1 in either the UK Album Chart (to 1989) or the UK Compilations Chart (January 1989 onwards).

It was released on double LP and cassette and launched the Hits Series.

Hits 1 features three songs which reached number one on the UK Singles Chart: "Freedom", "I Feel for You" and "Careless Whisper".

Track listing
Record/Tape 1 Side 1 (1)
Wham! – "Freedom"
Howard Jones – "Like to Get to Know You Well"
Alison Moyet – "All Cried Out"
Paul Young – "I'm Gonna Tear Your Playhouse Down"
Alphaville – "Big in Japan"
Laura Branigan – "Self Control"
Ray Parker Jr. – "Ghostbusters"
Michael Jackson – "Thriller"

Record/Tape 1 Side 2 (2)
Chaka Khan – "I Feel for You"
Billy Ocean – "Caribbean Queen"
The Jacksons – "Body"
The S.O.S. Band – "Just Be Good to Me"
Deniece Williams – "Let's Hear It for the Boy"
Miami Sound Machine – "Dr. Beat"
Sister Sledge – "Lost in Music"
Prince and The Revolution – "Purple Rain"

Record/Tape 2 Side 1 (3)
George Michael – "Careless Whisper"
The Cars – "Drive"
Chicago – "Hard Habit to Break"
Cyndi Lauper – "All Through the Night"
Thompson Twins – "Sister of Mercy"
The Stranglers – "Skin Deep"
Everything but the Girl – "Each and Every One"
Sade – "Smooth Operator"

Record/Tape 2 Side 2 (4)
ZZ Top – "Gimme All Your Lovin'"
Van Halen – "Jump"
Kenny Loggins – "Footloose"
Adam Ant – "Apollo 9"
Meat Loaf – "Modern Girl"
Rod Stewart – "Some Guys Have All the Luck"
Shakin' Stevens – "Teardrops"
Neil – "Hole in My Shoe"

See also
Hits (compilation series)
Now That's What I Call Music

References
 Collins Complete UK Hit Albums 1956-2005. Graham Betts. 2005. .

1984 compilation albums
CBS Records compilation albums
Warner Music Group compilation albums
Hits (compilation series) albums